José Tiburcio López Constante (< 1790 - 25 September 1858) was governor of Yucatán, Mexico.

Yucatán's first constitution was promulgated in 1825. Antonio López de Santa Anna was removed as military commander of the area and immediately resigned as governor of Yucatán. At that point, López Constant was appointed by the Congress as the new governor. He took office on April 25, 1825 and the following May 3 issued the call for the first elections were to be held in Yucatan under the new constitution. After performing these on August 21 of that year, the legislature declared Yucatán José Tiburcio Lopez constant as governor for the next four years and Peter de Souza as vice-governor. During this first period constant Lopez lead the government knew relatively peaceful despite the concern that exists in the national context for the struggle between federalists and centralists. Fostered productive activities in the state, particularly those relating to the henequen industry then began to develop.

A decade later, in 1844, Lopez was again constant Yucatán governor to be appointed by Antonio López de Santa Anna, then president of Mexico, based on the provisions of the Organic Bases, 1843 governing the centralist Mexico then. The designation is given, however, in the context of emergency in which recognized the right to Yucatán to govern independently and free trade also occurring him, what had been a repeated approach the Yucatán since joining the republic .

References

External links 
 Faccionalismo y votaciones de Yucatán (1824 - 1832). Melchor Campos García. UADY. Con acceso el 28 de marzo de 2012.
 Compendio de Historia de Campeche. Miguel Lanz. 1905 Con acceso el 19 de marzo de 2012.
 Los gobernadores de Yucatán
 ¿Federalismo o centralismo? por Manuel González Oropeza
 Mayas rebeldes y colonización del norte del río Hondo: La paradójica solución a un proyecto criollo yucateco UADY, Mérida, Yucatán (consultado el 29 de febrero de 2012)
 Prolegómenos del federalismo mexicano. Biblioteca Jurídica.org (consultado el 29 de febrero de 2012)

Year of birth unknown
1858 deaths
Governors of Yucatán (state)
Politicians from Yucatán (state)
People from Mérida, Yucatán
1790 births